The 2009 Morocco Tennis Tour – Tanger was a professional tennis tournament played on outdoor clay courts. It was part of the 2009 ATP Challenger Tour. It took place in Tanger, Morocco between 16 and 21 February 2009.

Singles main draw entrants

Seeds

 Rankings are as of February 9, 2009.

Other entrants
The following players received wildcards into the singles main draw:
  Rabie Chaki
  Talal Ouahabi
  Younes Rachidi
  Mehdi Ziadi

The following players received entry from the qualifying draw:
  Augustin Gensse
  Malek Jaziri
  Leandro Migani
  José Antonio Sánchez de Luna

Champions

Men's singles

 Marc López def.  Pere Riba, 5–7, 6–4, 7–6(9)

Men's doubles

 Augustin Gensse /  Éric Prodon def.  Giancarlo Petrazzuolo /  Simone Vagnozzi, 6–1, 7–6(3)

External links
 

2009
Tanger